Below are listed various examples of words and phrases that have been identified as shibboleths, a word or custom whose variations in pronunciation or style can be used to differentiate members of ingroups from those of outgroups.

Original shibboleth
The term originates from the Hebrew word , which means the part of a plant containing grain, such as the head of a stalk of wheat or rye; or less commonly (but arguably more appropriately) "flood, torrent".

The modern use derives from an account in the Hebrew Bible, in which pronunciation of this word was used to distinguish Ephraimites, whose dialect used a differently sounding first consonant. In the Book of Judges, chapter 12, after the inhabitants of Gilead under the command of Jephthah inflicted a military defeat upon the invading tribe of Ephraim (around 1370–1070 BC), the surviving Ephraimites tried to cross the River Jordan back into their home territory, but the Gileadites secured the river's fords to stop them. To identify and kill these Ephraimites, the Gileadites told each suspected survivor to say the word shibboleth. The Ephraimite dialect resulted in a pronunciation that, to Gileadites, sounded like sibboleth. In Judges 12:5–6 in the King James Bible, the anecdote appears thus (with the word already in its current English spelling):

Shibboleths used in war and persecution

Dutch–French
 Schild en vriend: On 18 May 1302, the people of Bruges killed the French occupiers of the city during a nocturnal surprise attack. According to a famous legend, they stormed into the houses where they knew the tenants were forced to board and lodge French troops serving as city guards, roused every male person from his bed and forced him to repeat the challenge schild en vriend (shield and friend). The Flemings pronounced  with a separate "s"  and "ch" ". Flemings would pronounce  with a voiced v whereas French would render those as a voiceless f.

Every Frenchman who failed the test was stabbed on the spot, still in his nightgown. Because the signal for the uprising was the matins bells of the city's churches and monasteries, this became known as the Bruges Matins or Brugse Metten. Like the name of the massacre, the story may have been influenced by the Sicilian uprising mentioned below.

 The problem with this legend is that in Medieval manuscripts of that time, a shield is referred to as "skilde" as in Norse and Norse-influenced English words. Therefore, it is sometimes said that the words must have been "'s gilden vriend" meaning "friend of the guilds." The combination of the 's and the g in "'s gilden" would be pronounced .

Italian/Sicilian–French
 Ciciri (chickpeas): This was used by native Sicilians to ferret out Angevin French soldiers in the late 13th century during the Sicilian Vespers, the uprising which freed the island from Angevin rule. Both the Italian soft c , and the Italian r, were (and are still) difficult for the French to pronounce as that sequence of sounds seldom appears in French; also, in French, words are primarily stressed on the final syllable.

Frisian–Dutch

 Bûter, brea, en griene tsiis; wa't dat net sizze kin, is gjin oprjochte Fries (meaning "Butter, rye bread and green cheese, whoever cannot say that is not a genuine Frisian") was used by the Frisian Pier Gerlofs Donia during a Frisian rebellion (1515–1523). Ships whose crew could not pronounce this properly were usually plundered and soldiers who could not were beheaded by Donia himself.

Castilian Spanish–Latin-American Spanish
 During the Latin American wars of independence, the name  was used by Colombian rebels to tell locals from Spaniards.

English–Dutch
 In the Peasants' Revolt of 1381 many Flemings "loste hir heedes at that tyme and namely they that koude nat say Breede and Chese, but Case and Brode."

Finnish–Russian
 : Finnish for "one", used by the White Guard to separate Russians from Finns in the Finnish Civil War during the invasion of Tampere. Many of the Russians caught had changed to civilian clothing, so suspected people were rounded up, even from hospitals, and asked to say   (or made count to ten in Finnish). If the prisoner pronounced it , mistaking the front vowel 'y' for an iotated 'u' (ю), he was considered a Russian foreign fighter and was shot on the spot. Any Slav or Balt, Communist or not, was killed, including some members of the White Guard.
 : Finnish for "steamroller", used by the Finnish Army in the Second World War. This word is almost impossible to pronounce for anyone not skilled in Finnish, with the frontal 'ö' and 'y' and rolled 'r' . For Russian speakers, the leading 'h' is also difficult.

Spanish–French and Haitian Creole
 Dominican dictator Rafael Trujillo conducted a massacre of undocumented Haitian settlers along the Dominican–Haitian border. The action is known as the Parsley Massacre. Suspects not fluent in Spanish either did not know or could not properly pronounce the Spanish word perejil ("parsley"). The pronunciation of the word by Haitian citizens tended to be with a trilled r, unlike the native Spanish tapped r, and without the 'l' at the end of the word.

Azeri–Armenian

Polish–German
 Soczewica, koło, miele, młyn, meaning "lentil, wheel, grinds [verb], mill": In 1312, the Polish Prince Ladislaus the Elbow-high quelled the Rebellion of wójt Albert in Kraków, populated mostly by Silesian, German and Czech citizens. Anyone over the age of 7 who could not pronounce these Polish words was put to death, ejected from the city or had their property confiscated. 'Ł' (then pronounced as a velarized alveolar lateral approximant, aka dark l) and dental [s̪] are both unlikely to be pronounced properly by Germans since they cannot make out the difference from their own sounds [l] and [s]. (The former was approximated by Germans as l, and has evolved now into a sound similar to English w).

Japanese–Korean
Following the 1923 Great Kantō earthquake, which occurred in an area with a high Korean population, there were rumors that the local Korean population poisoned the wells. This resulted in the killings of ethnic Koreans. The shibboleth "babibubebo" (ばびぶべぼ) was used to distinguish ethnic Koreans from Japanese, as it was thought that Koreans could not pronounce the shibboleth correctly and would pronounce it as "papipupepo". However, many ethnic Chinese were also killed as they were also unable to correctly pronounce the shibboleth.

Ukrainian–Russian
 Palianytsia: a type of Ukrainian bread. During the 2022 Russian invasion of Ukraine, the word palianytsia became one of those proposed to use to identify Russian subversive reconnaissance groups, as it is unlikely to be pronounced properly by Russians due to different phonetics of the Russian language according to apostrophe.ua. On Russian state television, Russia-1 television host Olga Skabeyeva pronounced this word as "polyanitsa" and said that it means strawberry, confusing it with another Ukrainian word, polunytsia.

Culture, religion and language-specific shibboleths
 English-speaking Allied personnel in Europe, during the Second World War, frequently made use of passwords in which labio-velar approximants (w-sounds) were prominent, as these are unusual in spoken German, and the letter w is normally pronounced "v" by native speakers of German. For instance, following D-Day (1944) US forces used the challenge-response "Flash" – "Thunder" – "Welcome".
 American soldiers could ferret out German infiltrators during their time in the Western Front. German spies were taught British English, which was different from American English. For example, Britons used the word lorry, for the American term truck. American soldiers used such words as a shibboleth to distinguish Nazi spies.
 Israeli forces during the 1948 Palestine war used passwords chosen to contain voiceless bilabial stops (p-sounds), which are not found in Arabic, and which native speakers of Arabic often replace with a voiced bilabial stop (b-sounds).
 In the Lebanese Civil War of 1975, Christian Lebanese soldiers targeted suspected Palestinians at checkpoints by asking how they pronounced the Arabic word for "tomato", which is pronounced "banadoura" in Lebanese Arabic and "bandoura" in Palestinian Arabic. If they said the former, they were let through; if they said the latter, they were shot on the spot.
 At the Battle of Mount Tumbledown in the 1982 Falklands War, the Scots Guards replaced the established passwords for their night attack with  the phrase "Hey Jimmie", because the Spanish-speaking Argentinians would have difficulty pronouncing the English consonant "J".
 During the Somali Islamic terrorist group al-Shabaab's 2013 shooting and hostage siege attack on the Westgate shopping mall in Nairobi, Kenya, the attackers asked for Islamic prophet Muhammad's mother Aminah bint Wahb's name and the shahada as religious shibboleths to determine Muslims and non-Muslims. Muslims were freed, while non-Muslims were targeted. An Indian man who could not name Aminah was shot dead.
 The mostly Christian Filipino ground troops fighting in the 2013 Zamboanga City crisis used the Lord's Prayer as a way to identify Moro insurgents. Those who could not recite the Lord's Prayer in any Philippine language, including English, were immediately suspected of being part of the armed Moro National Liberation Front and detained. All non-Christians, including non-combatant Muslims, would also fail the test.

Other non-English shibboleths

Dutch
 The sentence De zon in de zee zien zakken (Eye dialect: De son in de see sien sakke) 'to see the sun go under the sea', pronounced  (or, in broader accents) is used to identify speakers of the Amsterdam dialect, who lack the  phoneme. Contrary to the stereotype, any prevocalic  can be voiced in Amsterdam, but then so can any prevocalic  through the process of hypercorrection (so that suiker 'sugar', pronounced  in Standard Dutch may be pronounced  (spelled zuiker in eye dialect) in Amsterdam).

English shibboleths for native speakers or local natives

 Fish and chips: The accents of Australians and New Zealanders seem very similar, and the term fish and chips is sometimes evoked to illustrate a major difference between the two. In New Zealand pronunciation short i is a central vowel, . This vowel sound is sometimes caricatured as "fush and chups" by Australians. The Australian pronunciation has the front vowel  (which is more common in most varieties of English) which, due to an overall vowel shift in New Zealand, sounds like "feesh and cheeps" to the ears of a New Zealander, sounding like an instance of the "Fill–feel merger".
 Pronunciation of letters of the alphabet:
 H: in Northern Ireland pronounced 'aitch' by Protestants, and 'haitch' by Catholics, per Hiberno-English. Also often pronounced 'haitch' in dialects of English spoken in former colonies of Africa, Asia, and the Pacific, usually among non-native English speakers, but in the case of Australia, also among native speakers, especially those of Irish descent.
 Z: pronounced zee in the United States; typically zed in the rest of the world. Known in American history and popular culture for distinguishing American males who fled to Canada from the US to escape the military draft in the 1950s and 60s. The Canadian pronunciation was featured in the Molson Canadian I Am Canadian advertisement in 2000.
 In Highland Dress, for anyone who has served in a Scottish Regiment or played in a pipe band, or whenever said by a Scot, if ‘plaid’ should be used to refer to tartan cloth, it could be pronounced:  (to rhyme with 'had'). NB: This usage, as a synonym for 'tartan', is generally only ever found in North America. More often, however, when referring to the cape-like garment, in its various forms, worn over the left shoulder as part of the traditional or formal Scottish dress, the pronunciation is:  (to rhyme with 'made'); though the OED accepts both pronunciations in this usage. To further stress the difference in pronunciation of the garment versus the cloth, the garment has an alternative spelling 'plaide', though rarely used. Thus: belted-plaid, drummer's plaid, evening-plaid, fly-plaid, full-plaid, piper's plaid, et al., are pronounced  by those who have worn, or are familiar, with the same. Etymology: plaide (Scots) via Scottish Gaelic meaning 'blanket' or 'cloak' (albeit usually made of tartan; most often the same tartan as the wearer's kilt or trews).

Place-name pronunciations

In Australia

In Canada
Calgary, Alberta: citizens distinctively pronounce the name without the middle syllable of its spelling, thus:  .
Montréal, Québec: Anglophone Montrealers pronounce the name of their city with the  vowel in the first syllable, thus:  . The tendency of English speakers from elsewhere in North America, especially the US, to pronounce the first syllable with the  vowel (thus  ), immediately marks them as non-Montrealers to local ears. (However, Francophone Montrealers pronounce it , at least in their native French.)
 Newfoundland: Some outsiders pronounce the island name almost as if it were three separate words,   rather than the local pronunciation, rhyming with "understand".
Regina, Saskatchewan: Pronounced  , rhyming with "vagina". Familiarity with the standard pronunciation may in some cases distinguish Canadians from Americans.
Saskatchewan: Most Canadians will pronounce the name of this province with a schwa in all syllables except the second, where the stress is placed:  , while locals, especially in rural areas, often condense the name even further down to two syllables:  . In contrast, outsiders frequently stress the first syllable and fully pronounce all of its vowels:  .
Toronto, Ontario: Toronto is sometimes pronounced with the first syllable elided as if it were a two-syllable word:  "Tronto". Stronger local forms are  "Toronta" and  "Tronta", with the  vowel reduced to a schwa. but they are both more noticeable and generally less approved of, possibly because they deviate far enough from the spelling as to make the speaker sound potentially semiliterate. This shibboleth was referenced in the Oscar-winning movie Argo.

In Ireland
Dublin has several places with counterintuitive pronunciations:
Aungier Street: pronounced  to rhyme with "danger."
D'Olier Street: pronounced 
Dorset Street: pronounced  with stress on the second syllable, although placing the stress on the first syllable (like the English county) is increasingly common.
Iveagh Gardens and other places in Dublin named for the Earls of Iveagh are generally pronounced  (like "ivy"), although in Ulster "Iveagh" is typically pronounced  .
Jobstown: pronounced , like the Biblical Job.
Ranelagh: Locals, especially longtime residents, pronounce it , while others, including the Luas (tram) announcer, pronounce it  . 
Tallaght: 
Drogheda: mostly pronounced  by locals whereas outsiders typically pronounce it

In Malaysia

In New Zealand
 Bluff: The town of Bluff is almost always referred to by locals with the definite article as "The Bluff".
 Central Otago: Whereas most New Zealanders would talk about travelling to Central Otago or being in Central Otago, locals refer to travelling or being "up Central".
 Otago: Older residents will often end and begin the regions name with a schwa as  rather than the usual rounded "o".
 West Coast and East Coast: Without context or further description, among New Zealanders "The East Coast" usually refers to the northeast of the North Island, whereas "The West Coast" usually refers to the west coast of the South Island.

Various town and street names are pronounced in counter-intuitive ways. These include:
 Antigua Street, Christchurch: pronounced .
 Eltham: Although named after Eltham in England, the town's name is pronounced , not .
 Filleul Street, Dunedin: pronounced .
 Jervois Street, Dunedin: pronounced .
 Levin: pronounced .
 Te Puke: pronounced .

In the United Kingdom
 Belvoir Park, Belfast: Another French derived place name in Belfast.
 Magdalen Street, Oxford: The street is pronounced as   while the name of the College is always  . This inconsistency has non-locals mispronouncing one or the other, regardless of their default way of pronouncing the name.
 Newcastle Upon Tyne: The name is pronounced with penultimate stress and a short  in the region, whereas in the southeast of England it has an initial stress and a long :  .

In the United States
 Houston Street, New York City: Locals pronounce the first syllable identically with "house", while most visitors will employ the same pronunciation as in Houston, Texas. Houston Street is actually a corruption of the original name of Houstoun Street, named after Continental Congress Delegate William Houstoun, who pronounced his name in this way.
 Nevada: Nevadans (and other people who live in the Western US) say  . Visitors from outside the Western US often say  .
 The US state of Oregon is home to a county, city, river, bay, state forest, museum, Native American tribe, and dairy processing company called Tillamook.
 Boise, Idaho: The city's name is commonly pronounced  .
 Buena Vista, Colorado. Unlike other places bearing this name in the United States (typical pronunciations include  ) the town in Colorado is called   by locals. Buena Vista, Virginia, is pronounced the same way.
However, locals will pronounce it  .
 Likewise, Hull, Massachusetts would seem to be pronounced , as in the exterior of a ship, but locals will invariably render it  homophonous to "hall", as in a corridor.
However, non-locals will usually use  .
Newark, Delaware: The town is pronounced   though many outsiders will conflate the pronunciation with Newark, New Jersey, pronounced  .
The name was originally Native American, but came to English via Spanish as the local pronunciation is based on the Spanish equivalent.
 Pierre: South Dakotans read the name as  rhyming with "beer," not like the French given name .
 Tulalip, Washington: Locals pronounce it with the stress on the penultimate:  . Some non-locals analyze it by extension from tulip and try  .
 Albany, New York: Locals pronounce the first syllable as "all", whereas many non-locals pronounce the first syllable like the male name "Al."
 Auchentoroloy Terrace is neighborhood and street Baltimore, Maryland which is often cited as a name that people from outside the city are unlikely to know how to pronounce.

Place-name terms
 In Southern California, locals generally use the article "the" preceding the number of a freeway. Northern California locals generally do not use "the" before a numerical freeway name. For example, Southern Californians usually refer to Highway 101 as "The 101," whereas Northern Californians will refer to it as simply "101." By comparison, people in the rest of the United States more often precede a freeway's route number with its highway classification, as in "U.S. 101" for a Federal highway or "Interstate 5" or "I-5" for an interstate highway.
 Long-time and/or Democratic residents of Washington, D.C., often refer to Reagan National Airport by its older nickname, "National," out of habit or political pique, while Republicans and visitors are more likely to call it “Reagan National”.
 Additionally, some residents of the Washington, D.C. metropolitan area will refer to it as "The DMV" (the  District, Maryland, and Virginia, specifically referencing the Fairfax, Alexandria, and Arlington Counties of Virginia; the city itself; and the Montgomery and Prince George's Counties of Maryland). This frequently leads to outsiders confusing it with the local Department of Motor Vehicles or "Delmarva", the portmanteau of Delaware, Maryland, and Virginia (referring to the combined areas of the Eastern Shore of Maryland, Eastern Shore of Virginia, and Delaware), both of which can also be abbreviated to "DMV".
 In the San Francisco Bay Area, San Francisco is generally referred to by its full name, "SF" or as “the City”. In contrast, new residents and people from other parts of the US will often say "San Fran", clearly distinguishing transplants from locals.

See also
 Language analysis for the determination of origin
 List of names in English with counterintuitive pronunciations

Notes

References

Authentication methods
Shibboleths